Štěpánovice may refer to places in the Czech Republic:

 Štěpánovice (Brno-Country District), village and municipality in the South Moravian Region
 Štěpánovice (České Budějovice District), village and municipality in the South Bohemian Region